The Lower Saxony derby usually refers to a match between the two Lower Saxonian association football clubs Hannover 96 and Eintracht Braunschweig. As of 2023, 154 such matches have taken place: Eintracht Braunschweig won 68, Hannover 96 won 57, and 29 matches ended in a draw.

Description
In the media, matches of the two teams against VfL Wolfsburg and in part also against VfL Osnabrück are called Lower Saxony derbies; this view is not shared by many supporters and club officials.

History

The beginnings (1905–1963)
Eintracht Braunschweig was founded in 1895, Hannover 96 one year later as Hannoverscher Fußball-Club. The first match between the two teams took place in the first decade of the 1900s. Hannover 96 won the German championship in 1938 and 1954. Until the 1962–63 season, Braunschweig won 54 matches, with Hannover winning 38 matches and 14 matches ending in a draw.

Foundation of the Bundesliga in 1963: Birth of the sports rivalry
After the decision to create a nationwide Bundesliga, three clubs from the Oberliga Nord were permitted to participate in the Bundesliga. Since Hamburger SV and Werder Bremen were directly admitted to the Bundesliga, only one free spot remained. Since Hannover 96 had the larger stadium, the higher average attendance and better financial prerequisites und was also ranked higher than Braunschweig in the German Football Association's twelve-year ranking, Hannover's officials were sure that they would receive the spot in the Bundesliga. Still, Braunschweig was awarded the spot on 6 May 1963, for which the only criterion was their final position in the 1962–63 season: while Hannover 96 finished in ninth place, Braunschweig had come in third. In Hanover, the decision was met with incomprehension and provoked major protests. However, the official lawsuit against the licensing was dismissed. Many see the circumstances of the Bundesliga foundation as the cause or at least as a reinforcement of the rivalry between the clubs and their supporters.

Eintracht Braunschweig won the German championship in the 1966–67 season, but lost both season matches against Hannover 96.

Present day
In the recent past, the duels between Hannover and Braunschweig have become a rarity due to league affiliation. In the 1996–97 and 1997–98 seasons, when Hannover 96 was relegated to the third-tier Regionalliga, both clubs played for the championship and the promotion play-offs until the end of the season; Hannover 96 won the championship in the Regionalliga Nord both seasons. In 1998, the championship was decided through a win in the direct duel on the second-to-last matchday. A similar situation also occurred in the 2016–17 season, when Hannover was relegated to the 2. Bundesliga after 14 years in the Bundesliga and duelled Eintracht Braunschweig for a direct promotion spot until the last matchday. Hannover's win in the match against Braunschweig on the 29th matchday was co-deciding in this season. Braunschweig's last win against Hannover dates back to the 29th matchday of the 2013–14 Bundesliga season. However, the club was relegated at the end of the season, while Hannover remained in the Bundesliga.

In recent years, matches between the two clubs are always classified as high-risk matches by the police and extensive security measures are taken to contain the always massive riots of the fans during the derby.

Other Lower Saxony derbies
The matches of Hannover 96 and Eintracht Braunschweig against VfL Wolfsburg are also occasionally called Lower Saxony derbies, since VfL Wolfsburg is also based in Lower Saxony and has played in the Bundesliga since 1997. However, in public perception these matches are only seen as "real" derbies to a lesser extent, since especially the fan scenes of the other two clubs do not view Wolfsburg as a "real" club that is rich in tradition.

SV Meppen, which played in the 2. Bundesliga for a while in the 1990s, also played a few derbies against the Lower Saxonian northwestern rivals VfL Osnabrück and VfB Oldenburg as well as the then second-tier clubs Hannover 96 and Eintracht Braunschweig. Other teams that have played second-tier Lower Saxony derbies since the 1970s were Olympia Wilhelmshaven, Göttingen 05, Arminia Hannover, OSV Hannover and TSV Havelse.

Trivia
Before the match in Hanover during the first half of the 2013–14 Bundesliga season, Braunschweig supporters provoked the home fans with a pig that ran through the Hanover city centre wearing a Hannover club scarf and with the number 96 painted onto its side. Also, crosses were put up in the Braunschweig area and supporters of both clubs initiated vigilante groups in front of their stadiums. Furthermore, a brewery from Braunschweig was Hannover's shirt sponsor in the 1980s. Eintracht Braunschweig supporters avoid saying the club name "Hannover 96" and also the number 96, which is replaced with "95+1".

Statistics since 1963

Bundesliga

2. Bundesliga

Regionalliga Nord

DFB-Pokal

DFB-Ligapokal

Summary

Literature
 Werner Balhauff: Hannover 96 – von Tradition und Herzblut für den Fußball. Fakten, Mythen Wissen und Meilensteine. E-Book at Neobooks, 2015.
 Volker Bergmeister, Erich Scheck: Was für ein Tag!: 366 Kalendergeschichten rund um den Fußball. Norderstedt 2016, S. 351.

References

External links
 Bettina  Lenner, Florian Neuhauss: Braunschweig – Hannover: Rivalen aus Tradition. Norddeutscher Rundfunk, 12 April 2017

Football in Lower Saxony
Hannover 96
Eintracht Braunschweig
Association football rivalries in Germany